Sudbury Public Schools is a public elementary school district in Sudbury, Massachusetts, in Middlesex County, serving students in grades PK–8.

Schools 
 Ephraim Curtis Middle School
 Josiah Haynes Elementary School
 Israel Loring Elementary School
 General John Nixon Elementary School
 Peter Noyes Elementary School

Namesakes 

Ephraim Curtis, born in 1642, was a lieutenant, a trader, and a negotiator with the Nipmuc tribe.
 Josiah Haynes, born in 1696, was a church deacon and farmer. He was killed by the British in Lexington as he marched with the militia at age 79. 
 Israel Loring, born in 1682, was a Christian leader who lived next to the Town Hall.
General John Nixon, born in 1724, fought in the French and Indian Wars as a young man; later, as Colonel, he led men at the Battle of Bunker Hill.
 Peter Noyes, who arrived from England in 1638, was one of the first people to settle in Sudbury.

References

External links 
 Sudbury Public Schools website
 Israel Loring Elementary School
 Gen. John Nixon Elementary School
 Josiah Haynes Elementary School
 Peter Noyes Elementary School

School districts in Massachusetts
Education in Middlesex County, Massachusetts